Robert-Jules Garnier (1883–1958) was a French art director.

Selected filmography
 Judex (1916)
 Marquitta (1927)
 The Crew (1928)
 Little Devil May Care (1928)
 Billeting Order (1932)
 The Mad Night (1932)
 If You Wish It (1932)
 The Marriages of Mademoiselle Levy (1936)
 Fire in the Straw (1939)
 The Emigrant (1940)
 Father Serge (1945)
 Impeccable Henri (1948)
 Doctor Laennec (1949)

References

Bibliography
 Bergfelder, Tim & Harris, Sue & Street, Sarah. Film Architecture and the Transnational Imagination: Set Design in 1930s European Cinema. Amsterdam University Press, 2007.

External links

1883 births
1958 deaths
French art directors
People from Sèvres